Tomás Dávalos de Aragón (died 1621) was a Roman Catholic prelate who served as Titular Patriarch of Antioch (1611–1621).

Biography
Tomás Dávalos de Aragón was born in Spain.
On 21 Feb 1611, he was appointed during the papacy of Pope Paul V as Titular Patriarch of Antioch.
In 1611, he was consecrated bishop by Ottavio Acquaviva d'Aragona (seniore), Archbishop of Naples. 
He served as Titular Patriarch of Antioch until his death in 1621.

References

External links and additional sources
 (for Chronology of Bishops) 
 (for Chronology of Bishops) 

17th-century Roman Catholic titular bishops
Bishops appointed by Pope Paul V
1621 deaths
Latin Patriarchs of Antioch